Craig Wilson (born 28 May 1986) is a Scottish footballer who plays as a defender. Wilson started his career with Dunfermline Athletic, and has also previously played for Raith Rovers, Forfar Athletic, Ballingry Rovers, Linlithgow Rose and most recently Arbroath.

Career
Born in Dunfermline, Wilson attended Dunfermline High School where goalkeeper Greg Fleming was in the same year group. He began his career with hometown club Dunfermline Athletic, making his debut as a seventeen-year-old in April 2004. After playing two dozen first-team games for the Pars, Wilson spent most of the 2006–07 season on loan at Fife rivals Raith Rovers, joining permanently on a two-year deal at the start of the following season. Craig played every minute of every game during the 2007–08 season, which was repeated the following season.

Wilson signed for Forfar Athletic in 2011 but left the following summer, after a year out of the game he signed for junior side Ballingry Rovers in June 2013. Wilson was appointed club captain near the end of the 2013–14 season and played several games in centre midfield. Wilson subsequently had a spell with Linlithgow Rose, before signing for Scottish League Two side Arbroath at the start of the 2015–16 season. Wilson spent just one season with the Red Lichties before agreeing to leave the club in August 2016, having suffered an injury that restricted his playing time.

Honours

Raith Rovers

 Scottish Second Division: 1
 2008–09

References

External links
 

1986 births
Footballers from Dunfermline
Living people
Scottish footballers
Scottish Premier League players
Scottish Football League players
Association football midfielders
Dunfermline Athletic F.C. players
Raith Rovers F.C. players
Forfar Athletic F.C. players
Ballingry Rovers F.C. players
Linlithgow Rose F.C. players
Arbroath F.C. players